Emeq HaArazim is a valley in the Judean Mountains of Israel.

It is located on the northwestern edge of Jerusalem in the Judean Mountains, at an altitude of over 550 meters. Numerous springs spring up here, especially Einot Telem. The bottom of the valley has the original character of a rural landscape, but along the southern edge of the depression passes the body of Highway 1. In the southeast rises the hill Har HaMenuchot with a large cemetery area. To the west stands the town of Mevaseret Zion on the hills above the valley. Not far from the northern edge of the valley runs the Green Line separating the West Bank and the Palestinian village of Beit Iksa.

In the second decade of the 21st century, the Tel Aviv–Jerusalem railway, a high-speed railway line, was built across the valley with a bridge over the Emeq HaArazim, which holds a national altitude record (almost 100 meters).

See also
Geography of Israel

References

Geography of Jerusalem
Valleys of Israel